ISO 3166-2:UM is the entry for the United States Minor Outlying Islands in ISO 3166-2, part of the ISO 3166 standard published by the International Organization for Standardization (ISO), which defines codes for the names of the principal subdivisions (e.g., provinces or states) of all countries coded in ISO 3166-1.

Currently for the United States Minor Outlying Islands, ISO 3166-2 codes are defined for 9 "islands, groups of islands".

Each code consists of two parts, separated by a hyphen. The second part is two digits, which is the old FIPS 5-2 numeric code of the island or group of islands.

As an outlying area of the United States, the United States Minor Outlying Islands are also assigned the ISO 3166-2 code  under the entry for the United States.

ISO 3166-2:UM does not include the Caribbean islands of Serranilla Bank or Bajo Nuevo Bank, both of which are claimed by the United States but administered by Colombia.

Current codes
Subdivision names are listed as in the ISO 3166-2 standard published by the ISO 3166 Maintenance Agency (ISO 3166/MA).

Click on the button in the header to sort each column.

See also
 FIPS country codes, where each island or group of islands is assigned a code

External links
 ISO Online Browsing Platform: UM
 Territories of United States Minor Outlying Islands, Statoids.com

2:UM
United States Minor Outlying Islands